Jǐ (or Jì) is the Mandarin pinyin romanization of the Chinese surname written  in simplified Chinese and  in traditional Chinese. It is romanized as Chi in Wade–Giles, and Kei in Cantonese. Ji is the 136th most common surname in China, with a population of 1.1 million. It is listed 122nd in the Song dynasty classic text Hundred Family Surnames. It is 42nd in the Hundred Family Surnames, contained in the verse 熊紀舒屈 (Xiong, Ji, Shu, Qu).

Demographics
As of 2008, Ji  is the 136th most common surname in China, shared by 1.1 million people, or 0.088% of the Chinese population. It is concentrated in Beijing, Anhui, Jiangsu, and Shandong, which together account for 48% of the total.

Origin
Ji  originated from the ancient state of Ji in present-day Shouguang, Shandong province. In 690 BC, Ji was conquered and annexed by Duke Xiang of the neighbouring state of Qi, and the people of Ji adopted the name of their former state as their surname. The Ji  surname is a branch of Jiang , the surname of ruling clan of the Ji state.

Notable people
Ji Xin (died 204 BC), general serving under Liu Bang during the Chu–Han contention
Ji Ling (2nd century AD), general serving under Yuan Shu during the Eastern Han dynasty
Ji Zhan (253–324), Jin Dynasty general
Ji Chuna (died 710), Tang dynasty chancellor
Ji Junxiang (13th century), Yuan dynasty playwright, author of The Orphan of Zhao
Empress Ji (died 1475), Ming dynasty empress, mother of the Hongzhi Emperor
Ji Yun (1724–1805), Qing dynasty scholar and government minister, chief editor of the Siku Quanshu
Ji Dengkui (1923–1988), Vice Premier of China, key figure of the Cultural Revolution
Chi Cheng (born 1944), Olympian track and field athlete of Taiwan
Ji Baocheng (born 1944), former President of Renmin University of China
Chi Ta-wei (born 1972), Taiwanese writer
Samingad or Ji Xiaojun (born 1977), aboriginal Taiwanese singer
Chi Shu-ju (born 1982), Taiwanese taekwondo practitioner and Olympic medalist
Ji Minjia (born 1982), singer
Ji Yanyan (born 1985), member of Chinese women's basketball team at the 2012 Summer Olympics
Perenna Kei or Ji Kaiting (born 1989 or 1990), youngest billionaire in the world according to Forbes

References

Chinese-language surnames
Individual Chinese surnames